The Tiwana family of Shahpur is a Muslim Rajput family. They are one of the largest landowning families in the Punjab and have played an influential role in Punjabi politics since the seventeenth century.

Background

Origins
Mir Ali Khan, the founder of the family, settled at Okhali Mohlah in the district of khushab in the mid 17th century. In around 1680 his son Mir Ahmad Khan built Mitha Tiwana.

18th century
Mir Ahmad Khan's successors Dadu Khan and Sher Khan continued to build up Mitha Tiwana helping it to become a thriving town in the region. Sher Khan considerably enlarged his territory at the expense of neighbouring Awan tribes and refused to pay tribute to his governors at Dera Ismail Khan. In 1745 he founded the village of Nurpur Tirwana. He later rebelled against Inayat Khan of the Jhang Sials who had placed him in charge of the village of Mari, driving the Sials out of Khai and laying siege to Kot Langar Khan. Inayat Kan would later defeat Sher Khan when he sent an army to relieve the siege. Sher Khan died in 1757, leaving two sons Khan Muhammad Khan and Khan Beg Khan.

Khan Beg Khan usurped his brother Khan Muhammad Khan as chief, when the latter had gone to Jhang to visit kinsmen. Khan Muhmmad subsequently raised an army from Nurpur Tirwana, defeated his brother and imprisoned him. Khan Muhammad was engaged in constant battles with neighbours. He marched on Lal Khan, the Chief of Khushab, opening fire on the town and tying prisoners to the guns to divert the fire of the enemy. Lal Khan called Mahan Singh Sukharchakia, an old friend of Khan Muhammad, to his aid, and Mahan Singh bought a large force compelling Khan Muhammad to retire.

Sikh Empire
Towards the end of his reign Khan Beg once again took up arms against Khan Muhammad. In 1803, Khan Muhammad agreed to pay Maharajah Ranjit Singh a subsidy of one lakh of rupees to defeat Khan Beg. Despite this victory over his brother, in 1804 he was compelled by his son Ahmad Yar Khan to yield the chiefship to him.

In 1817, Maharajah Ranjit Singh sent a force under Misr Diwan chand against Ahmad Yar Khan, who subsequently submitted to his authority, and was granted the jagir of Jhawrian worth around ten thousand rupees. Hari Singh Nalwa was granted the jagir of Mitha Tiwana in 1819. In 1821, Ahmad Yar Khan marched with the Maharajah against his old enemy the Nawab of Mankera. The Maharajah, impressed by the Tiwana Horse, insisted on a troop of fifty horsemen returning with him to Lahore. Ahmad Yar Khan's brother, Khuda Yar Khan was appointed rough rider to the Maharajah, and superintended his hunting expeditions until his death in 1837. Khuda Yar Khan's son Fateh Khan rose to prominence first serving under Hari Singh Nalwa and then through the patronage of Raja Dhyan Singh. He was involved in the murder of Pashaura Singh alongside Chattar Singh Attariwalla. He was killed at the outset of the Second Anglo-Sikh War by mutineers at his fort of Dalipnagar in Bannu.

British India
A number of members of the family achieved recognition for assistance provided during Indian Rebellion of 1857. Fateh Sher Khan rendered service at Hissar and Jhajjar, whilst his cousin Sher Muhammad Khan assisted in the Doaba, Oudh and Bareilly. Each were rewarded with jagirs and the title Khan Bahadur. A further cousin Sahib Khan was also elevated to Khan Bahadur, granted nearly nine thousand across of land in Kalpi and a jagir worth 1,200 rupees. Sahib Khan's son Umar Hayat Khan became a decorated soldier in the British Indian Army and was elected to the Council of the Secretary of State for India. His son Khizar Hayat Tiwana would be the last Premier of the Punjab in British India.

Notable family members
Fateh Khan - Sikh era politician 
Sir Sahib Khan - army officer and large landowner
Sir Umar Hayat Khan - Member of the Council of the Secretary of State for India
Sir Khizar Hayat Tiwana -  the last Premier of the Punjab
Saeed Tiwana - Pakistani Major and recipient of the Sitara-e-Jurat
Shahzadi Umerzadi Tiwana, politician

References 

History of Punjab
History of Pakistan
Pakistani noble families
Tiwana family